Seonhak Station is a subway station on Line 1 of the Incheon Subway in Jiha480, Gyeongwon-daero, Yeonsu-gu, Incheon, South Korea.

Station layout

Exits

References

Metro stations in Incheon
Seoul Metropolitan Subway stations
Railway stations in South Korea opened in 1999
Yeonsu District